Trevor Phillips (born 1953) is a British broadcaster and former politician. 

Trevor Phillips may also refer to:

Trevor J. Phillips (1927–2016), educational philosopher who wrote about transactionalism
Trevor Phillips (footballer) (born 1952), English retired professional footballer

See also
Trevor Philips, a character from video game Grand Theft Auto V